Tsukioka Settei (1710 – 22 January 1787) was a Japanese ukiyo-e artist.

Settei was born in Ōmi Province and studied painting in Osaka in the style of the Kanō school under .  He was strongly influenced by the work of the ukiyo-e artist Nishikawa Sukenobu.  Settei's produced a number of printed works, but his bijin-ga paintings of female beauties are considered his most representative works.

References

Works cited

External links
 
 Tsukioka Settei at ukiyo-e.org

1710 births
1787 deaths
Ukiyo-e artists
Artists from Shiga Prefecture